The 1988 UMass Minutemen football team represented the University of Massachusetts Amherst in the 1988 NCAA Division I-AA football season as a member of the Yankee Conference. The team was coached by Jim Reid and played its home games at Warren McGuirk Alumni Stadium in Hadley, Massachusetts. The 1988 season marked the Minutemen's first playoff appearance since their runner-up finish in the 1978 National Championship game. UMass finished the season with a record of 8–4 overall and 6–2 in conference play.

Schedule

References

UMass
UMass Minutemen football seasons
Yankee Conference football champion seasons
UMass Minutemen football